Norge Idag (literally "Norway Today") is a Norwegian Christian conservative weekly newspaper published in Bergen. In cooperation with the television channel Visjon Norge, Norge Idag bought former cinema Forum Kino on Danmarksplass in Bergen which are also used as the newspaper's offices. The editor-in-chief is Finn Jarle Sæle.

Controversies
Among the editorial positions taken by the newspaper is opposition to legalizing gay marriage and gay adoption. The paper also served as a mouthpiece for Jan-Aage Torp when he encouraged Christians to use directed prayer in order to oust gays from positions of power.

This call for a prayer campaign was discussed in a number of media, including Dagbladet.

Circulation
Confirmed net circulation figures from Norwegian Media Businesses' Association:
2000: 9 452
2001: 12 275 
2002: 12 222 
2003: 11 329 
2004: 10 442
2005: 10 231
2006: 10 154 
2007: 10 167
2008: 10 293 
2009: 10 493
2010: 10 691
2011: 11 034

References

External links
 Official website

1999 establishments in Norway
Christian newspapers published in Norway
Conservatism in Norway
Newspapers published in Bergen
Publications established in 1999
Weekly newspapers published in Norway